JAC Motors (officially Anhui Jianghuai Automobile Co., Ltd.) is a Chinese automobile and commercial vehicle manufacturer. The company is based in Hefei, Anhui Province, China.

The company produced about 524,000 units in 2021, including 271,800 commercial vehicles and 252,500 passenger vehicles. It also sold 16,800 BEVs in December 2021.

History
Established in 1964 as Hefei Jianghuai Automobile Factory, its name was changed to Anhui Jianghuai Automobile Co., Ltd. in 1997. The company made an IPO on the Shanghai Stock Exchange in 2001.

JAC has historically only produced commercial trucks under the brand name Jianghu(undei), but MPVs and SUVs appeared in the 2000s. By 2007, the company had gained government approval for passenger car production but, nonetheless, continued to be referred to as a truck maker. Prior to the 2007 acquisition of a passenger car license, JAC cooperated with Hyundai Motor Company in the early 2000s in an attempt to expand its product line. Beginning in 2003, it assembled Hyundai MPVs although this stopped sometime prior to 2007. At least two models based on Hyundai technology continued to be made by JAC after the cooperation was cancelled–a MPV and a SUV. Hyundai explored setting up a joint venture with the company in 2004.

In 2009, the Chinese government indicated that it supported consolidation in the Chinese auto industry, leading analysts to predict the possibility of JAC joining with Chery since they are both located in Anhui province. On the surface such a merger would make sense: Chery mainly built passenger cars, and JAC was almost entirely focused on trucks at the time. Since then, however, JAC has made it clear that it is not interested in consolidation under the aegis of the larger Chery. JAC has begun to concentrate more on passenger cars, and a 2010 announcement of a new electric vehicle program may—at least partially—have been an effort to stave off the rumored merger.

Sales reached more than 445,000 units in 2012.

In 2013  it was one of the top ten most-productive vehicle manufacturers in China selling 458,500 units for 2.5% market share and reaching eighth place. JAC dropped one spot to ninth in 2011 making nearly 500,000 vehicles, and in 2012 a fall in units produced to about 445,000 precipitated the company's moving down one more rung to tenth place. Estimated production capacity is over 500,000 units/year as of 2009.

In 2016 JAC entered into an agreement with DR Automobiles to export its vehicles to Italy. JAC models made in China will be re-approved according to European safety and anti-pollution regulations by DR and sold with the DR badge. The first cars imported into Italy are the JAC Refine S3 renamed DR4 (or EVO 4) and the JAC iEV40 sold as the DR Evo Electric (or EVO 3 Electric).

In 2017 JAC Motors and Volkswagen Group announced a joint venture to produce electric cars for the Chinese market with the SEAT brand, in April 2018 the JAC-Volkswagen joint venture was officially born, which however operates through the new Sol brand, and no longer SEAT. The first product is the SOL E20X vehicle, an electric crossover resulting from a badge engineering of the JAC iEV40 (also called JAC Refine S2 EV) with a front redesigned by the SEAT style center in Spain.

In 2020, Volkswagen Group signs letters of intent between Volkswagen (China) Investment Co. Ltd. and the Government of Anhui Province, for the increase of the Volkswagen Group's stake in the JAC Volkswagen joint venture, from the current 50% to 75%. A transition that also requires investment in JAG (JAC Group), the parent company of JAC Motors and owned by the Government.
The agreement between the parties, subject to the usual regulatory approvals, provides for the investment of an amount equal to one billion euros and should be concluded by the end of the year.
Volkswagen would also acquire 50% of JAG (the parent company of JAC).

Products

JAC has a wide model line that spans from commercial trucks to small city cars, all directly copied from European or Asian manufacturers. In 2009, a Pininfarina-designed city car, the JAC Tojoy, won numerous awards including the J.D. Power China Automotive Performance, Execution and Layout (APEAL) award.

In the 2000s, its flagship model was the Refine (Ruifeng in Chinese). The restyled 2004 Ruifeng Gold featured 60% Chinese-made part content.

Passenger vehicles
There are multiple JAC passenger car sub-brands, each with their own design language. Originally, the Heyue sub-brand was the main brand, for sedans, hatchbacks, MPVs, and SUVs, while the Refine sub-brand was for large MPVs/minivans and vans. In 2016, along with the introduction of a new logo for the Refine brand, most Heyue vehicles were facelifted and moved to the brand. In 2019, a new sub-brand, Jiayue, was introduced. Multiple Refine vehicles have been facelifted and moved to this brand. The Heyue brand was discontinued in 2017 and the final models were replaced by electric variants. As of 2020, JAC started to rebadge the products under the Jiayue series as Sol vehicles. Resulted in the Sol A5, Sol X4, Sol X7, and Sol X8. The rebadge is in fact a move to move all sedans and crossovers under the Sol brand and making the Refine brand a MPV-focused brand.

JAC/Heyue
Former
 Rein (2007–2013), compact SUV
 Binyue/ J7 (2008–2012), mid-size sedan
 Heyue Sedan/ J5 (2011–2017), compact sedan and hatchback
 Heyue Tongyue/ J3 (2008–2017), subcompact sedan and hatchback
 Yueyue (2010–2016), city car
 Yueyue Cross (2012–2016), mini crossover
 Heyue A20 (2013–2014), subcompact sedan
 Heyue A30/ J4 (2012–2016), subcompact sedan
 Heyue RS/ M2 (2011–2012), compact MPV
 Heyue S30/ S3 (2015–2016), subcompact SUV

Refine
Current
 Refine A60 (2015–present), mid-size sedan
 Refine M3 (2015–present), compact minivan
 Refine M4 (2016–present), mid-size minivan
 Refine M5 (2002–present), full-size minivan
 Refine M6/ M6 MAX/ L6 MAX (2013–present), full-size minivan
 Refine R3 (2017–present), compact MPV
 Refine S2/iEV7S (2015–present), subcompact SUV
 Refine S2 Mini (2016–present), subcompact crossover
 Refine S3 (2016–present), subcompact SUV
Former
 Refine M2 (2012–2016), compact MPV
 Refine S4 (2018–2020), compact SUV
 Refine S5 (2013–2019), compact SUV
 Refine S7 (2017–2020), mid-size SUV

Jiayue
Current
 Jiayue A5 (2019–present), compact sedan
 Jiayue A5 Plus (2021–present), compact sedan
 Jiayue X4 (2020–present), compact SUV
 Jiayue X6 (2022–present), compact SUV
 Jiayue X7 (2020–present), mid-size SUV
 Jiayue X8 (2020–present), mid-size SUV

Electric vehicles
Current
 e-JS1 (2021–present), based on the Yueyue (iEV6E)
 e-JS4
 e-J7
 iC5 (2020–present), based on the Jiayue A5
 iEV6E (2016–present), based on the Refine S2 Mini
 iEV7 (2014–2016 (iEV), 2016–present (iEV7)), based on the Heyue A20
 iEV7S (2016–present), based on the Refine S2
 iEVA50 (2018–present), based on the Heyue
 iEVA60 (2019–present), based on the Refine A60
 iEVS4 (2019–present), based on the Refine S4
Former
 iEV4 (2011–2016 (Tongyue EV), 2016–2018 (iEV4)), based on the Tongyue

In August 2010, JAC had plans to make electric or hybrid-electric vehicles at a then unbuilt production facility.

The JAC J3 EV all-electric car was launched in China in 2010. Between 2010 and 2011, a total of 1,585 of the first and second generation models were sold in the country. A third generation, called the JAC J3 iev, was launched in September 2012. During 2012, the J3 EV was the second best selling pure electric car in China, after the Chery QQ3 EV. In 2013, about 2,500 JAC iEV (J3 EV) were sold making it the highest selling pure electric vehicle in China of 2013. Cumulative sales reached 10,161 units through June 2015.

JAC of Mexico has announced that will launch five electric vehicles for Mexico. The announced products are the E-Sei 1 and the E-Sei 2, both of which will be launched in February 2020, the E-Sei 4, which will be launched in the second trimester of 2020, E-J4, and E-Frison T8, with the latter both of which their respective launch dates are unknown. All of them will be locally built in Sahagun City, Hidalgo.

Light trucks, pickups, and vans
Sunray (2.5 and 2.8 litre)
JAC Ruiling/ JAC Reni/ JAC K5
V7
Hunter
Shuailing
Shuailing H series
Shuailing W series 
Shuailing K series
Shuailing X series
Shuailing T6 Pickup 
Shuailing T8 Pickup 
Shuailing i series
Shuailing G series
Junling
Junling E series
Junling V series
Junling G series
Kangling/ HY()
K series
H series
X series
G series

Logos

Operations
A 40,000 unit/year medium-to-heavy truck production base should become operation in 2012 and is probably located in Hefei.

Research and development
An R&D facility in Hefei, capital of the Anhui province, is complemented by three overseas R&D centres in Turin, Tokyo and Seoul.

Joint ventures

JAC-Navistar Diesel Engine Company (JND)
JAC announced a pair of joint ventures with Navistar International Corporation , NC2 Global (itself a Navistar/Caterpillar joint venture). The NC2 joint venture will manufacture heavy duty trucks. The Navistar joint venture, called JAC-Navistar Diesel Engine Company (JND), will build medium to heavy diesel engines in China with parts and services provisioned by Navistar. The new companies will both be located in Hefei where JAC is also based. Cummins purchased Navistar's equity in the engine joint venture in 2018.

JAC-Volkswagen (Sehol) 

Sehol (Sihao) is a car brand launched on April 24, 2018, by SEAT and JAC Volkswagen Automotive Co., Ltd. joint venture.

Sales

Sales outside China
JAC began the export of vehicles to Bolivia in 1990, later expanding to over one hundred countries. Light trucks are a popular export product.

Some JAC exports are in the form of knock-down kits, which are assembled at overseas factories in countries including Egypt, Ethiopia, Vietnam, Mexico and Iran. As of 2010, a possible factory in Slovakia is under discussion. Such factories are not necessarily owned by or affiliated with JAC. Knock-down exports are an easy way to gain access to developing markets without added after-sales service costs.

In 2009, JAC started a partnership with a distributor in Brazil, the SHC group. As of early 2011, it had more than 10,000 firm orders from its Brazilian partner. JAC also had plans to build a production base in the country as of 2009. This plan remained active until at least 2011, at which time the plant was to be located in Bahia state and built in cooperation with the SHC group, which was to provide 80% of the initial investment.

In 2016, JAC entered the Philippines market through a local partner, selling heavy-duty trucks, and in 2018, passenger cars.

In 2017, JAC announced a joint venture in Mexico with Giant Motors (company owned by tycoon Carlos Slim). A factory has been built at Ciudad Sahagún, in the State of Hidalgo. With a surface of 65,000 square meters, has two lines of production with a capacity of over 25,000 units per year. Since early June 2017, two models are sold in Mexican market: SEI2 and SEI3, both SUVs are made in Mexico in this facility, the compact sedan J4 was added to the line-up in 2018.

Notes

References

External links

JAC Motors official website in China
Official website JAC in Russia
Official website JAC in UAE
JAC in Austria 
JAC in Switzerland
JAC in Brazil
JAC in Costa Rica

 
Electric vehicle manufacturers of China
Car manufacturers of China
Chinese brands
Vehicle manufacturing companies established in 1964
Truck manufacturers of China